Five Mile Creek is a western television drama series adapted from Louis L'Amour's novel The Cherokee Trail and produced in Australia.  It starred Liz Burch, Louise Caire Clark, Rod Mullinar, Jay Kerr, Michael Caton, Peter Carroll, Gus Mercurio, Martin Lewis, Priscilla Weems and Nicole Kidman. It also featured a then-unknown Asher Keddie in her film debut. Jonathan Frakes was a guest star as Maggie's estranged husband, Adam Scott. The series aired on the Disney Channel in the US in the 1980s.

Main cast
Louise Caire Clark ...  Maggie Scott
Liz Burch ...  Kate Wallace
Jay Kerr ...  Con Madigan
Rod Mullinar ...  Jack Taylor
Michael Caton ...  Paddy Malone
Gus Mercurio ...  Ben Jones
Priscilla Weems ...  Hannah Scott
Martin Lewis ...  Sam Sawyer
Nicole Kidman ... Annie
Peter Carroll ...  Charles Withers
Scott McGregor ...  Edward Armstrong

Production
The first two seasons cost $12 million to make. The show was popular on the Disney Channel in the US but struggled in the ratings in Australia.

DVD releases
Only Season One of Five Mile Creek has been released on DVD. No release information is known for Seasons Two and Three on DVD.

Episode list

Season 1: 1983–84

Season 2: 1984

Season 3: 1985

References

External links 
 
 
 Fan website
 Five Mile Creek at AustLit

Disney Channel original programming
Australian drama television series
1983 Australian television series debuts
1985 Australian television series endings
Television shows set in colonial Australia
Australian Western (genre) films
Films directed by Frank Arnold